Under United Nations Security Council Resolution 678, a coalition of 35 countries, led by the United States, fought Iraq in the Gulf War from 1990–1991.

Coalition by number of military personnel

Coalition by command

Army Central Command

Marine Central Command

Joint Forces Command East

Joint Forces Command North

Commanders of coalition

Bangladesh
Zubayr Siddiqui

Czechoslovakia
Ján Való

Egypt
Mohamed Hussein Tantawi
Mohammed Ali Bilal
Sami Anan

France
Michel Roquejeoffre

Italy
Mario Arpino

Saudi Arabia
Khalid bin Sultan
Saleh Al-Muhaya
Sultan Al-Mutairi

Syria
Mustafa Tlass

United Kingdom
 Air Chief Marshal Sir Patrick Hine RAF -  joint commander of all British forces 
Air Chief Marshal Sir Michael Graydon - Air Officer Commanding-in-Chief RAF Strike Command
General Sir Peter de la Billière - Commander-in-Chief of British Forces
General Sir John Chapple - Chief of the General Staff

United States

Norman Schwarzkopf
Colin Powell
Calvin Waller
Charles Horner
Walt Boomer
Stan Arthur
Frederick Franks
Buster Glosson

Coalition by equipment

United States

Tanks
M1A1 Abrams MBT (Main Battle Tank)
M60A1/A3 Patton MBT (Main Battle Tank) (USMC)
M551A1 Sheridan TTS (Tank Thermal Sight) Armored Reconnaissance Airborne Assault Vehicle

Armored vehicles
M2A2 Bradley IFV (Infantry Fighting Vehicle)
M3A2 Bradley CFV (Cavalry Fighting Vehicle)
AAVP7A1 Assault Amphibian Vehicle Personnel (USMC)
LAV-25 Light Armored Vehicle (USMC)
LAV-AT Light Armored Vehicle (Anti-Tank) (USMC)
M113A2/A3 APC (Armored Personnel Carrier)
TPz Fuchs APC NBC and EW variants (UOR acquisition from Germany)
M901A1 ITV (Improved TOW Vehicle)

Self-propelled artillery/mortars/rockets
LAV-M Light Armored Vehicle (Mortar) (USMC)
M106A2 Self-Propelled Mortar Carrier
M109A2/A3/A4 155 mm SPH (Self-Propelled Howitzer)
M110A2 8 inch SPH (Self-Propelled Howitzer)
M270 MLRS Multiple Launch Rocket System

Anti-aircraft
M163 VADS Vulcan Air Defence System
M48 Chaparral Self-Propelled SAM (Surface-To-Air Missile) Launcher
M1097 Avenger Humvee
 M167 VADS Vulcan Air Defence System
MIM-23 Improved Hawk SAM (Surface-To-Air Missile) Launcher
MIM-104 Patriot SAM (Surface-To-Air Missile) Launcher

Artillery and mortars
M102 105 mm Towed Howitzer
M198 155 mm Towed Howitzer
M58 MICLIC (Mine Clearing Line Charge) Towed
M224 60 mm Light Weight Mortar
M252 81 mm Medium Weight Mortar
M30 107 mm Heavy Weight Mortar

Engineering and recovery vehicles
M728 Combat Engineer Vehicle 
M9 Armored Combat Earthmover
M60 AVLM (Armored Vehicle Launched MICLIC (Mine-Clearing Line Charge))
M88 Armoured Recovery Vehicle
M60A1 Armored Vehicle Launched Bridge
M578 Light Recovery Vehicle (Armoured Recovery Vehicle)
D7 Caterpillar (armored Bulldozer)
M139 Volcano Mine System

Command vehicles
M577A2 ACP (Armored Command Post) Carrier
AACV7A1 (Assault Amphibian Vehicle Command) (USMC)
LAV-25C2 Light Armored Vehicle (Command & Control) (USMC)
M981 FISTV (Fire Support Team Vehicle)

Other vehicles
M998 Humvee
M151A2 FAV (Fast Attack Vehicle) (USMC)
M1008 CUCV (Commercial Utility, Cargo Vehicle)
FAV (Fast Attack Vehicle) / DPV (Desert Patrol Vehicle)
Kawasaki KLR-250-D8
M35A2 6x6 2.5-Ton Truck "Deuce And A Half"
 M925A1 6x6 5-Ton Truck
M548 Tracked Cargo Carrier
M992 FAASV (Field Artillery Ammunition Supply Vehicle)
M1059 Smoke Generator Carrier

Helicopters
Sikorsky CH-124 Sea King (Canadian Forces)
Bell AH-1F Cobra (Army)
Bell AH-1J SeaCobra (USMC)
Bell AH-1T Improved SeaCobra (USMC)
Bell AH-1W  SuperCobra (USMC)
Boeing AH-64A Apache (Army)
Boeing CH-46D Sea Knight (United States Navy)
Boeing CH-46E Sea Knight (USMC)
Boeing CH-47D Chinook (Army)
Sikorsky CH-53D Sea Stallion (USN, USMC)
Sikorsky CH-53E Super Stallion (USN, USMC)
Bell EH-1H Iroquois (Huey) (Army)
Sikorsky EH-60A Quick Fix (Army)
Boeing HH-46D Sea Knight (USN)
Sikorsky HH-60H Seahawk (USN)
Boeing MH-47 (SOA) Special Operations Aircraft (Army)
Sikorsky MH-53 Pave Low (USAF)
Sikorsky MH-53E Sea Dragon (USN)
Sikorsky MH-60G Pave Hawk (USAF)
Bell OH-58A Kiowa (Army)
Bell OH-58C Kiowa (Army)
Bell OH-58D (Army)
Sikorsky RH-53D Sea Stallion (USMC)
Kaman SH-2F Seasprite (USN)
Sikorsky SH-3G Sea King (USN)
Sikorsky SH-3H Sea King (USN)
Sikorsky SH-60B Seahawk (USN)
Bell UH-1H Iroquois (Huey) (Army)
Bell UH-1N (Huey) (USMC)
Bell UH-1V Iroquois (Huey) Aeromedical Evacuation (Army)
Boeing UH-46D Sea Knight (USN)
Sikorsky UH-60A Black Hawk (Army)

Aircraft
Grumman A-6E Intruder (USN, USMC)
LTV A-7E Corsair II (USN)
McDonnell Douglas AV-8B Harrier II (USMC)
Fairchild Republic A-10A Thunderbolt II "Warthog" (USAF)
Lockheed AC-130A (Spectre) Gunship (USAF)
Lockheed AC-130H (Spectre) Gunship (USAF)
Boeing B-52G Stratofortress (USAF)
Grumman C-2A Greyhound (USN)
Lockheed C-5 Galaxy (USAF)
McDonnell Douglas C-9B Skytrain II (USN)
Raytheon C-12 Huron (USAF)
Lockheed C-130 Hercules (USAF)
Lockheed C-130F Hercules (USN)
Lockheed C-141 Starlifter (USAF)
North American Rockwell CT-39G (USN)
McDonnell Douglas DC-9 (USN)
Grumman E-2C Hawkeye (USN)
Boeing E-3B Sentry AWACS Airborne Warning And Control System (USAF)
Douglas EA-3B Skywarrior (USN)
Lockheed EP-3E Aries II (USN)
Grumman EA-6B Prowler (USN)
Boeing E-8 Joint STARS Joint Surveillance Target Attack Radar System (USAF)
General Dynamics EF-111A Raven (USAF)
Lockheed EC-130E/J Commando Solo (USAF)
Lockheed EC-130H Compass Call (USAF)
Boeing EC-135L Looking Glass (USAF)
McDonnell Douglas F-4E Phantom II (USAF)
McDonnell Douglas F-4G Phantom II (Wild Weasel) (USAF)
Grumman F-14A Tomcat (USN)
Grumman F-14A+(B) Tomcat (USN)
McDonnell Douglas F-15C Eagle (USAF)
McDonnell Douglas F-15E Strike Eagle (USAF)
General Dynamics F-16A Fighting Falcon (USAF)
General Dynamics F-16C Fighting Falcon (USAF)
McDonnell Douglas F/A-18A Hornet (USN, USMC)
McDonnell Douglas F/A-18C Hornet (USN, USMC)
McDonnell Douglas F/A-18D Hornet (USMC)
General Dynamics F-111E Aardvark (USAF)
General Dynamics F-111F Aardvark (USAF)
Lockheed F-117A Nighthawk (USAF)
Lockheed HC-130 King (USAF)
McDonnell Douglas KC-10A Extender (USAF)
Lockheed KC-130F Hercules (USN, USMC)
Lockheed KC-130R Hercules (USMC)
Lockheed KC-130T Hercules (USMC)
Boeing KC-135E Stratotanker (USAF)
Boeing KC-135R Stratotanker (USAF)
Lockheed MC-130E Hercules Combat Talon (USAF)
North American Rockwell OV-10A Bronco (USMC)
North American Rockwell OV-10D Bronco (USMC)
North American Rockwell OV-10D+ Bronco (USMC)
Lockheed P-3B Orion (USN)
Lockheed P-3C Orion (USN)
Boeing RC-135V/W Rivet Joint (USAF)
McDonnell Douglas RF-4C Phantom II (USAF)
Lockheed S-3A Viking (USN)
Lockheed S-3B Viking (USN)
Lockheed U-2/TR-1 (USAF)
Lockheed UP-3A Orion (USN)

Aircraft carriers
 
 
 
 

Battleships
 

Submarines
 

Amphibious assault ships
 
 

Guided missile cruisers
 
 
 
 
 

Destroyer tenders
 Samuel Gompers class
 Yellowstone class (USS Yellowstone, USS Cape Cod)

Destroyers
  (USS Oldendorf, USS Moosbrugger, USS Leftwich, USS Harry W. Will, USS Fife)

Guided missile destroyers
  (USS Macdonough, USS Coontz, USS Preble)
  (USS Kidd)

Frigates
  (USS Marvin Shields, USS Francis Hammond, USS Vreeland, USS Thomas C. Hart)
  (USS McInerney, USS Jarrett, USS Curts, USS Halyburton, USS Nichola, USS Hawes, USS Ford, USS Samuel B. Roberts)

Amphibious transport docks
 Raleigh class (USS Raleigh, USS Vancouver)
  (USS Ogden)
  (USS Denver, USS Juneau, USS Shreveport)
  (USS Trenton)

Ammunition ships
  (USS Mauna Kea)
  (USS Nitro, USS Haleakala)
  (USS Kilauea, USS Santa Barbara, USS Mount Hood, USS Shasta, |USS Kiska)

Dock landing ships
 Anchorage class (USS Anchorage, USS Portland, USS Pensacola, USS Mount Vernon)
  (USS Germantown, USS Fort McHenry, USS Gunston Hall)

Tank landing ships
  (USS Manitowoc, LST-1180. USS Peoria, USS Frederick, USS Cayuga, USS Saginaw, USS Spartanburg County, USS La Moure County, USS Barbour Country)

Fast sealift ships
 SL-7 Type (USS Algol, USNS Bellatrix, USS Denebola, USS Pollux, USNS Altair, USS Regulus, USS Capella)

Fleet oilers
 Neosho class (USS Neosho, USS Hassayampa, USS Ponchatoula)
 Cimarron class (USS Platte)
 Henry J. Kaiser class (USS Joshua Humphreys, USNS Andrew J. Higgins, USS Walter S. Diehl)

Combat stores ships
  (USS Mars, USS Sylvania, USS Niagara Falls, USS San Diego, USS San Jose)
 Sirius class (USNS Sirius, USNS Spica)

Fast combat support ships
 Sacramento class (USS Sacramento, USS Seattle, USS Detroit)

Replenishment oiler ships
 Wichita class (USS Kansas City, USS Kalamazoo)

Minesweepers
  (USS Impervious)

Repair ships
 Vulcan class (USS Vulcan, USS Jason)

Rescue and salvage ships
 Edenton class (USS Beaufort)

Sealift ships
 Wright class (USS Wright, USS Curtiss)

Hospital ships
 

Amphibious cargo ships
 Charleston class (USS Durham, USS Mobile)

Mine countermeasure ships
 Avenger class (USS Avenger)

Survey ships
 Chauvenet class (USS Chauvenet)

Light watercraft
 LCU 1610 (Landing Craft Utility)
 LCAC (Landing Craft Air Cushion)

United Kingdom

Tanks
FV4030/4 Challenger MBT (Main Battle Tank)
FV4003 Centurion Mk.5 AVRE 165 (Armoured Vehicle Royal Engineers)

Armoured vehicles
FV101 Scorpion Reconnaissance
FV102 Striker  Anti-tank missile launcher
FV103 Spartan Armoured personnel carrier
FV104 Samaritan Armoured Ambulance
FV106 Samson Armoured recovery vehicle
FV107 Scimitar Reconnaissance
FV432  Armoured Personnel Carrier
FV432  Armoured Ambulance
FV510 Warrior Infantry fighting vehicle
Ferret armoured car
TPz Fuchs APC NBC and EW variants (UOR acquisition from Germany)

Self-propelled artillery/mortars/rockets
FV432(M) self-propelled mortar carrier
M10 155 mm Self-Propelled Howitzer (M109A2 variant)
M110 8 inch Self-Propelled Howitzer (M110A2 variant)
M270 Multiple Launch Rocket System

Anti-aircraft
Rapier Field Standard B2 Stationary SAM launcher
Tracked Rapier TR1 Mobile SAM (Surface-To-Air Missile) Launcher
Javelin LML (Lightweight Multiple Launcher) SAM launcher

Artillery and mortars
L118 105 mm Light Gun
 51 mm Light Mortar
L16A1 81 mm Mortar

Engineering and recovery vehicles
FV4205 Chieftain AVLB (armoured vehicle-launched bridge)
FV180 CET (Combat Engineer Tractor)
FV434 ARV (Armoured Recovery Vehicle)
FV512 Warrior Mechanised Combat Repair Vehicle
FV513 Warrior Mechanised Recovery Vehicle (Repair)

Command vehicles
FV105 Sultan

Other vehicles
Land Rover Defender
 Leyland 4x4 4-Tonne Lorry
 Bedford 4x4 8-Tonne Lorry
 Leyland Daf 8x6 14-Tonne Medium Mobility Load Carrier (MMLC) Demountable Rack Offloading and Pick Up System (DROPS) Lorry.
Mercedes Unimog Support Vehicle
 Harley Davidson MT530E
 Armstrong 500
M548 Tracked Cargo Carrier

 Volkswagen Iltis (Canadian Forces during Operation Scalpel)

Aircraft
Aérospatiale-Westland Gazelle AH.1 (AAC)
Westland Lynx AH.1 and AH.7 (AAC)
Westland Lynx HAS.3 (RN)
Boeing Chinook HC.1B (RAF)
Westland Sea King HC.4 (RN)
Aérospatiale Puma HC.1 (RAF)
Panavia Tornado GR.1 (RAF) - Interdictor/Strike
SEPECAT Jaguar GR.1A (RAF)
Panavia Tornado F.3 (RAF) air defence
Blackburn Buccaneer S.2B (RAF)
BAe Nimrod MR.2P (RAF)
Britten-Norman BN-2 Islander AL.1 (RAF)
Handley Page Victor K.2 (RAF) - tanker
Lockheed TriStar (RAF)
Lockheed Hercules C.1, C.3 (RAF)
Vickers VC10 C.1 (RAF) - cargo
Vickers VC10 K.2, K.3 (RAF) -tanker

Destroyers
 Type 42 Sheffield destroyer

Frigates
 
 Type 22 Broadsword frigate

Submarines
 Oberon-class submarine

Mine countermeasure vessels
  (HMS Dulverton, HMS Bicester, HMS Atherstone, HMS Hurworth)

Fleet support vessels
 
 RFA Olna -Fast fleet tankers
 RFA Regent - Stores ship
 RFA Fort Grange -Stores ship
 RFA Diligence - Fleet repair ship

Hospital ship
 RFA Argus - "Primary casualty reception vessel"

Saudi Arabia

Tanks
AMX-30S MBT (Main Battle Tank)
M60A1/A3 Patton  MBT (Main Battle Tank)

Armoured vehicles
M2A2 Bradley IFV (Infantry Fighting Vehicle)
AMX-10P IFV (Infantry Fighting Vehicle)
AMX/HOT ATGM (Anti-Tank Guided Missile) Launcher
Panhard AML-60 Armoured Car
Panhard AML-90 Armoured Car
M113A1 APC (Armored Personnel Carrier)
Engesa EE-11 Urutu APC (Armored Personnel Carrier)
 Panhard M3 VTT APC (Armored Personnel Carrier)
 Cadillac Gage V-150 Commando
 Cadillac Gage V-150 Commando (Imp. TOW)

Self-propelled artillery/mortars/rockets
M109A2 155 mm SPH (Self-Propelled Howitzer)
AMX-GCT 155 mm SPH (Self-Propelled Howitzer)
ASTROS-II MLRS (Multiple Launch Rocket System)
M106A2 Self-Propelled Mortar Carrier
 Cadillac Gage V-150 Commando (Mortar 81 mm)
 Cadillac Gage V-150 Commando (Mortar 90 mm)

Artillery and mortars
 M56 105 mm Towed Howitzer
M102 105 mm Towed Howitzer
M198 155 mm Towed Howitzer
M30 107 mm Heavy Weight Mortar

Anti-aircraft
M163 VADS Vulcan Air Defence System
 AMX-30SA Shahine Self-Propelled SAM (Surface-To-Air Missile) Launcher
 AMX-30SA SPAAA (Self-Propelled Anti-Aircraft Artillery)
MIM-23 Improved Hawk SAM (Surface-To-Air Missile) Launcher
 Shahine Stationary SAM (Surface-To-Air Missile) Launcher
Bofors 40 mm L/70 AAA (Anti-Aircraft Artillery)
Oerlikon-Buhrle Twin 35 mm GDF AAA (Anti-Aircraft Artillery)

Other vehicles
Land Rover Defender

Helicopters
Sikorsky UH-60A Black Hawk (RSLF)
Agusta-Bell 205 Iroquois (RSAF)
Agusta-Bell 206 Jet Ranger (RSAF)
Agusta-Bell 212 Agusta (RSAF)
Kawasaki KV-107 (RSAF)
Eurocopter AS-365N Dauphin (Navy)
Eurocopter AS-332B Super Puma (Navy)

Aircraft
Lockheed C-130E Hercules (RSAF)
Lockheed C-130H Hercules (RSAF)
Boeing E-3A Sentry AWACS Airborne Warning And Control System (RSAF)
Northrop F-5E Tiger II (RSAF)
McDonnell Douglas F-15C Eagle (RSAF)
Lockheed KC-130H (RSAF)
Northrop RF-5E Tigereye (RSAF)
Panavia Tornado IDS Interdictor/Strike (RSAF)
Panavia Tornado ADV Air Defence Variant (RSAF)

Frigates
  (Al Madinah, Hofouf, Abha, Taif)

Corvettes
  (Badr, Al Yarmook, Hitteen, Tabuk)

Patrol ships
  (Al-Siddiq, Al-Farouq, Abdul-Aziz, Faisal, Khalid, Amr, Tariq, Ouqbah, Abu Obadiah)

Replenishment ships
  (Boraida, Yunbou)

Kuwait

Tanks
M-84AB MBT (Main Battle Tank)

Armoured vehicles
BMP-2 IFV (Infantry Fighting Vehicle)
M113A1 APC (Armored Personnel Carrier)

Helicopters
Aérospatiale SA.342 Gazelle

Aircraft
Dassault Mirage F1CK (KAF)
McDonnell Douglas A-4KU Skyhawk (KAF)

Fast attack craft
 Lürssen FPB-57 (unknown number)
 Lürssen TNC-45 (unknown number)

France

Tanks
AMX-30B2 MBT (Main Battle Tank)

Other armoured vehicles
GIAT AMX-10RC armoured car
Panhard AML-90 armoured car
Panhard ERC-90F4 Sagaie armoured car
GIAT VAB (Véhicule de l'Avant Blindé) wheeled troop carrier
GIAT VAB-PC (Véhicule de l'Avant Blindé - Poste de Commandement) command vehicle
GIAT VAB-VCAC/HOT (Véhicule de l'Avant Blindé - Véhicule de Combat Anti-Char) ATGM (Anti-Tank Guided Missile) launch vehicle
GIAT VAB-VTM (Véhicule de l'Avant Blindé - Véhicule Tracteur de Mortier) mortar tractor

Artillery and mortars
 TR-F1 155 mm towed howitzer
 MO-81-61C 81 mm mortar
 MO-120-RT-61 120 mm mortar

Anti-aircraft
 GIAT 20 mm 53T2 towed AAA (Anti-Aircraft Artillery)
Mistral SAM (Surface-To-Air Missile) launcher

Other vehicles
Peugeot P4 4WD
 VLRA (Vehicle de Liaison et Reconnaissance de L'Armee) truck

Helicopters
Aérospatiale SA-342 Gazelle (ALAT)
Aérospatiale SA-330 Puma (ALAT)
Aérospatiale Super Frelon (Aéronavale)

Aircraft
Dassault Mirage F1C-200 (AdA)
Dassault-Breguet Mirage 2000 (AdA)
SEPECAT Jaguar A (AdA)
Dassault Super Étendard (Aéronavale)

Aircraft carriers
 

Amphibious transport docks
 

Cruisers
 

Destroyers
 
 

Corvettes
  (Premier maître l'Her)

Minehunters
 s, L'Aigle, Cassiopee, Orion, Pluton, Sagittaire

Replenishment ships
 

Support ships
 , Loire

Qatar

Tanks
 AMX-30S MBT (Main Battle Tank)

Italy

Fighter jets
8 Panavia Tornado IDS Interdictor/Strike

Destroyers


Frigates
 
 

Replenishment ships
 

Poland

Hospital ship

Salvage ship

Czechoslovakia

Other vehicles
Tatra T-815 (Heavy truck)
UAZ-4629 (All-terrain vehicle mounted with chemical reconnaissance probes)
ARS-12M (De-contamination truck based on Praga V3S)
POP (Mobile field medical truck based on Praga V3S)

Canada

Destroyers
  
 

Fighter aircraft
 26 CF-18

Transport aircraft
 27 CC-130 Hercules
 5 CC-137 (Boeing 707)

Helicopters
 5 Sikorsky CH-124 Sea King

Patrol, surveillance aircraft
 1 CC-144 Challenger

Supply/replenishment ship
 

Argentina

Destroyers
 1 MEKO 360: ARA Almirante Brown (D-10) (CF A. Tierno). ARA Almirante Brown navigated 25.000 NM in the designated area for operations, as part of GT 88, together with ARA Spiro. Returned to Argentina on 25 April, 1991.

Frigates
2 MEKO 140 A16 (Espora class): ARA Spiro (P-43) (CF O. Gonzalez), ARA Rosales (P-42) (CC Tebaldi / CC Rossi). ARA Spiro returned to Argentina on 23 May 1991, together with ARA Almirante Brown (D-10). It had navigated 23000 NM in the operations area during the conflict.

Amphibious cargo ships
1: ARA Bahia San Blas (B-5). Loaded with medicine and food, for humanitarian aid. This ship along with ARA Rosales (P-42) formed GT 88.1, and replaced GT 88.0 formed by ARA Almirante Brown and ARA Spiro.

Helicopters
2 Alouette III (3-H-109 and 3-H-112), from 1° Esc. Aeronaval de Helicopteros (EA1H) (C.C. Alomar). Totalling 67 flights. Operated initially with P-43 and D-10. One of the Aluettes suffered an accident, with no casualties.

Transport aircraft
 2 Boeing 707 (TC-91 and TC-94/LV-LGO as UN UNAG-1)

Australia

Destroyers


Frigates


Replenishment ships



Transport aircraft
 1 Boeing 707
 4 Lockheed C-130 Hercules

Norway

Patrol ships
 , NoCGV Andenes

Denmark

Corvettes
 , HDMS Olfert Fischer

Greece

Frigates
 , HS Elli

Spain

Destroyers
 , Blas de Lezo

Corvettes
 s, Descubierta, Diana, Infanta Cristina, Cazadora, Vencedora

The Netherlands

Frigates
 s, HNLMS Pieter Florisz, HNLMS Philips van Almonde
 s, HNLMS Witte de With, HNLMS Jacob van Heemskerck

Minehunters
 s, HNLMS Harlingen, HNLMS Haarlem, HNLMS Zierikzee

Replenishment ships
 , HNLMS Zuiderkruis

Mobile field hospital
 53 medical personnel stationed on site

Maritime patrol aircraft
 Two P-3C Orions

Belgium

Frigates
 s, Wielingen, Wandelaar

Minehunters
 s Myosotis, Iris, Dianthus

Support ships
 , Zinnia

Turkey

Destroyers
 , TCG Yucetepe

Notes and references
 Nationmaster.com – Gulf War Coalition – Troops by country
 Arabic-Radio-TV.com – The Gulf Coalition Countries in 1991 – Contribution by country

Gulf War
20th-century military alliances